Capparis radula is a species of climbing shrub in the family Capparaceae.  The recorded distribution includes Indo-China and may be called cáp (bán nao) in Vietnam.  No subspecies are listed in the Catalogue of Life.

References 

radula
Flora of Indo-China
Taxa named by François Gagnepain